Sandy Oaks is a city in Bexar County, Texas, United States. The community voted to incorporate in an election held on May 14, 2014. A total of 128 votes were cast in the election, 96 (75%) in favor of incorporation and 32 (25%) against.

Geography
Sandy Oaks is located along Interstate 37 at the intersection of Priest and Mathis roads in southeastern Bexar County. The city covers a total of 2.39 square miles.

Demographics

Education
The city of Sandy Oaks is served by the Southside Independent School District.

References

Notes

External links

City of Sandy Oaks – Official website

Cities in Bexar County, Texas
Cities in Texas
Greater San Antonio
Populated places established in 2014